James Yap ((26 September 1933 – 2003) was a Chinese Filipino basketball player who competed as part of the Republic of China's squad at the 1956 Summer Olympics. He graduated from Chiang Kai-shek College. He was born in 1933 on Gulangyu Island, Xiamen, China and moved to the Philippines at the age of 5. In 1954 he attended the FIBA World Basketball Championship in Rio de Janeiro and the Asian Games in Manila as a member of the Republic of China team. In 1956, he was a member of the ROC team to the Olympics in Melbourne and once again in Rome in 1960. He died in 2003.

References

External links
 

1933 births
2003 deaths
Taiwanese men's basketball players
Taiwanese people of Filipino descent
Olympic basketball players of Taiwan
Basketball players at the 1956 Summer Olympics
Basketball players at the 1954 Asian Games
Asian Games medalists in basketball
Basketball players from Fujian
Chinese men's basketball players
Taiwanese people from Fujian
Asian Games silver medalists for Chinese Taipei
Medalists at the 1954 Asian Games
People from Xiamen
1954 FIBA World Championship players
Republic of China men's national basketball team players